WUSR, also known as 99.5 WUSR Scranton Royal Radio, is a college radio station broadcasting at 99.5 MHz FM in Scranton, Pennsylvania. It is owned and operated by the University of Scranton.

Programming
Like many college radio stations, 99.5 WUSR Scranton Royal Radio carries a diverse range of programming. During the week from 8-10 a.m., the Pell Radio Reading Service, which is being offered in partnership with the Department of Communication and the Lackawanna Branch of the Pennsylvania Association for the Blind, orates daily news updates from the local Times-Tribune newspaper in Scranton, Pa.

The station primarily broadcasts several hours of Alternative, Loud Rock, Urban, Sports Talk and General Talk shows. All shows for each genre last two hours. Weekends primarily consist of freeform programming, with many specialty shows focusing on musical genres and topics such as soundtracks, Blues, and Polka.

External links
 
 

University of Scranton
Mass media in Scranton, Pennsylvania
USR
USR
Radio stations established in 1993
1993 establishments in Pennsylvania